The 1971 FIBA Europe Under-16 Championship (known at that time as 1971 European Championship for Cadets) was the first edition of the FIBA Europe Under-16 Championship. The city of Gorizia, in Italy, hosted the tournament. Yugoslavia won their first title.

Teams

Preliminary round
The twelve teams were allocated in two groups of six teams each.

Group A

Group B

Knockout stage

9th–12th playoffs

5th–8th playoffs

Championship

Final standings

Team Roster
Dragan Todorić, Predrag Tripković, Ante Zaloker, Dragan Kićanović, Marko Martinović, Milan Milićević, Zoran Biorac, Rajko Žižić, Mirza Delibašić, Željko Morelj, Radmilo Lukovac, and Mirko Grgin.
Head coach: Mirko Novosel.

References
FIBA Archive
FIBA Europe Archive

FIBA U16 European Championship
1971–72 in European basketball
1971–72 in Italian basketball
International youth basketball competitions hosted by Italy